Techint is an Argentine conglomerate founded in Milan in 1945 by Italian industrialist Agostino Rocca and headquartered in Milan (Italy) and Buenos Aires (Argentina). As of 2019 the Techint Group is composed of six main companies in the following areas of business: engineering, construction, steel, mining, oil & gas, industrial plants, healthcare. Techint, with its subsidiaries, is the largest steel making company in Argentina. 

Techint claims to be the world's largest manufacturer of seamless steel tubes, mainly used in the oil industry. As of 2013, the Techint Group had a workforce of 51,200 permanent employees.

History 
Agostino Rocca, an executive at Ansaldo and later at Dalmine and SIAC (steel and iron industries) founded Compagnia Tecnica Internazionale (Italian for "Technical International Company") in Milan in September 1945, but developed its main activity worldwide. The original company name was changed after to Techint, its abbreviated telex code.

The company began providing engineering services to a growing number of clients in Latin America -to where Agostino Rocca had traveled after World War II- and Europe. Construction activities soon followed: the first major Techint Engineering and Construction (E&C) project was a network of large diameter pipelines in Argentina and Brazil.

Awarded a contract to build a 1,600 km (1,000 mi) gas pipeline from Comodoro Rivadavia to Buenos Aires in 1949 by President Juan Perón, Techint became a leading government contractor during Perón's ambitious infrastructure program in Argentina. Creating subsidiaries in Brazil (1947), Chile (1951), and Mexico (1954), the company opened its first seamless steel tube plant in Campana, in 1954; in 1969, Techint's Ensenada plant became the only Argentine manufacturer of cold rolled steel.

In the 1980s important projects were undertaken in Argentina, Brazil, Ecuador and Mexico, and the company diversified into new fields of activity, building the first nuclear facilities and offshore platforms.

In the early 1990s Techint purchased a stake in Argentina's then-leading steel manufacturer, the state-owned SOMISA. A significant part of Techint's core manufacturing strength has since been concentrated in the San Nicolás-Villa Constitución oil-and-steel corridor, where the company is involved in the production of cold rolled steel. In those years, the Techint Group invested in oil and gas blocks in Argentina through exploration and production company Tecpetrol. 

In Italy, the Techint Group entered the health services sector by building and managing Istituto Clinico Humanitas (ICH), a hospital and medical research institute near Milan.

Tenaris, the company under which all the manufacturing and service activities in the steel pipe business are grouped today, went public at the end of 2002, quoted on the Buenos Aires, Mexico City and Milan stock exchanges; its American depositary receipts are listed on the New York Stock Exchange.

On August 23, 2005, the Techint group bought 99.3% of Mexican Hylsamex for US $2.2 billion. In press release, Techint stated that the Mexican steel manufacturer, and its previous steel manufacturers Siderar (Argentina) and Sidor (Venezuela) would be under a new subsidiary called Ternium, headquartered in Luxembourg.

On April 30, 2007, Ternium took control of Grupo IMSA, a major player in the Mexican steel industry.

Venezuela nationalized Sidor in 2008, following a series of industrial disputes over the previous year. Compensation of around US$1.97 billion was agreed for the nationalisation of Ternium's 60% stake in Sidor, with the former keeping a 10% stake in the company, but frictions emerged with the Kirchner administration in Argentina over their reported refusal to raise objections to the nationalization with President Chávez.

In 2016 the Techint Group entered the mining industry through the Tenova's acquisition of several companies operating in this field.

Divisions 
Tenaris:  A global supplier of tubular products and services used in drilling, completion and production of oil and gas, in process and power plants, and in specialized industrial and automotive applications. Companies owned by the Techint group through Tenaris include: Dalmine (Italy), Siderca, and Siat (Argentina), Confab (Brazil), Tamsa (Mexico), Algoma (Canada), Silcotub (Romania). and has production facilities in the US and a joint venture with NKK (Japan), holding 51% of NKK shares since 1999, making it the first Japanese steel company in foreign majority ownership. Its total steel tube shipments exceeded 4.5 million tons in 2008. 
Ternium: A Latin American supplier of flat and long steel products, produced in three integrated steel mills located in Argentina, Mexico, USA and Guatemala with an overall capacity of nearly 9 million tons per year. 
Techint Engineering & Construction: A group of companies rooted in Italy and Latin American countries, as well as the Middle East, Asia and Africa, specialized in the design and construction of pipelines, oil and gas facilities, petrochemical plants, power plants and transmission lines, mining and metal complexes, and other infrastructure and civil projects.
Tenova: Tenova's subsidiaries operate in five continents supplying direct reduction plants, submerged arc furnaces, cold rolling mills, strip processing lines, roll grinders, automated roll shops, engineering and EPCM services, mining and bulk handling systems (see: Tenova Takraf), minerals processing and modular plants, solid/liquid separation solutions, furnaces and smelting plants.
Tecpetrol: Active in oil and gas exploration and production in several Latin American countries and the United States.
Humanitas: runs some health care institutions.

References

External links

 

 
Companies based in Buenos Aires
Companies based in Milan
Multinational companies headquartered in Italy
Multinational companies headquartered in Argentina
Conglomerate companies established in 1945
Manufacturing companies established in 1945
Italian companies established in 1945
Steel companies of Italy
Steel companies of Argentina